Geroa Socialverdes, officially Geroa Socialverdes de Navarra en Europa/Nafarroako Sozialberdeak Europan (GSB/GSV) is a regional party based in Navarre founded in September 2020 by former president of Navarre Uxue Barkos and integrated within the Geroa Bai coalition.

References

Geroa Bai
2020 establishments in Spain
Political parties established in 2020
Political parties in Navarre